Thomas Castaignède (born 21 January 1975) is a rugby union footballer from Mont-de-Marsan.

Born in Mont-de-Marsan, Aquitaine, Castaignède played as a junior and senior for Stade Montois in various positions, initially as fly-half or centre, and latterly as fullback. He joined Toulouse to help them win French titles in three successive seasons, and lifted the inaugural European Cup with the club. Castaignède then played for Castres Olympique before joining Saracens.

Developing his career in preparation for his retirement, Castaignède became a rugby union columnist for The Guardian, a television pundit for Canal+ and occasionally ITV Sport, and started an association and occasional work with French banking group Société Générale. On 10 May 2007, despite offers to return to France with various clubs, Castaignède announced his retirement from the sport after the 2007 Rugby World Cup in September, choosing to pursue a career in banking in London.

References

External links
Profile at Saracens official site
ERC profile
List of caps, Part 1 (sporting-heroes.net)
List of caps, Part 2 (sporting-heroes.net)

1975 births
Living people
People from Mont-de-Marsan
French rugby union players
Rugby union fullbacks
Stade Toulousain players
Saracens F.C. players
France international rugby union players
Sportspeople from Landes (department)
Stade Montois players